Hochiss or Hochriss is a mountain in Tyrol, Austria. Its steep north face is popular with rock climbers and its other slopes are a popular destination for hiking and paragliding as well as snowshoeing and ski touring in the winter.

References 

Mountains of the Alps
Brandenberg Alps
Mountains of Tyrol (state)